Campamento de Verano was a Spanish reality-show airing on Telecinco. It started airing on 16 July 2013. The camp was situated on Sierra de Gredos. The final was on 9 September with José Manuel Montalvo as the winner of the format.

Cast

Hosts
 Joaquín Prat is a journalist and TV host.

 Sonia Ferrer is an actress and TV host.

Jury
 Belén Rodríguez is a journalist, most known from social programs.

 Jimmy Giménez-Arnau is a journalist, poet and novelist.

 Kiko Hernández was a housemate on Gran Hermano 3 and TV host.

Camp instructor
 Sgto. Héctor Alonso is a military and personal trainer.

Contestants

Nominations Table

Notes 
 : The jury will decide who is evicted from the summer camp, judging from their behavior and attitude.
 : The contestants have to throw a dart into images of the contestants, but if they fail, their nomination will be for the other one. Who they wanted to nominate is on scratched. if they don't failed, there is the nomination.
 :  Gaby wanted to nominate David but failed and didn't nominate anyone, she had to repeat it, and failed again, failed for the third time and they decided to change the rules and the jury decided to nominate Gaby automatically.
 :  Two of the nominees will be saved on Tuesday by public vote, and the other two will face the jury on Thursday. David (52.77%) and Gaby (18.63%) were saved by the public. Jeyko received 14.62% and Karmele 13.98%.
 :  There was an immunity challenge. They have to find two medallions in a pool of mud, then the two contestants who find them will face the public vote and via internet they will decide who was immunity. Esteban and Montalvo found the two medallions and the public decided, with 54.7%, that Esteban is immune. Montalvo received 45.3% of the votes.
 : Lucía's replacement entered in the camp on Day 14. There were two candidates: Noemí (GH 12+1 housemate) and María Jesús (The Farm housemate) were the two candidates. The public had to choose one of them to enter in the camp. Noemí was the one chosen, with 71.12% of the votes. María Jesús received 28.88%.
 :  One of the nominees will be saved on Monday by public vote, and then the public will evict between the other two on Thursday. David (66%) was saved by the public. Modesto received 20% and Olvido 14%.
 : Olvido and Esteban were both punished, for insult each other. As punishment, they will be connected by a rope until Thursday - they have to sleep, eat and do all together. As Olvido is nominated, if Olvido is evicted, Esteban is too.
 : After the 2nd eviction, is the public who decide who is evicted from the summer camp.
 :  There was an immunity challenge. They have to play the punching ball of something like that, two of them will win and the jury will decide who win immunity. Esteban and Jacobo are the ones who lasted longer in the immunity challenge. The jury decided to give immunity to Jacobo.
 :  One of the nominees will be saved on Monday by public vote, and then the public will evict between the other two on Thursday. David (58.01%) was saved by the public. Gaby received 21.92% and Jeyko 20.07%.
 : Because Karmele was evicted by the jury, the public is now voting if she should re-enter in the camp or not. Karmele returned to the camp, with 50.98% of the votes.
 :  There was an immunity challenge in two teams, men team and women team. They have to catch a pig with black spots, one of each team will win and the jury will decide who win immunity. Jeyko and Noemí are the ones who caught a pig with black spots in the immunity challenge. The jury decided to give immunity to Jeyko.
 :  One of the nominees will be saved on Monday by public vote, and then the public will evict between the other two on Thursday. David (52%) was saved by the public. Montalvo received 28% and Mónica 20%.
 : Karmele failed 3 times trying to nominate Montalvo so she got one extra point for her. David also failed to nominate and he received another extra point for him. David, Karmele and Mónica received 2 votes and for this round the minimum of nominees was 3 so the jury had to save one nominee. They saved Karmele.
 :  There was an immunity challenge in two teams, men team and women team. Jeyko and Noemí are the ones who got a place in the immunity challenge. The jury decided to give immunity to Jeyko.
 :  One of the nominees will be saved on Monday by public vote, and then the public will evict between the other two on Thursday. Noemí (61.91%) was saved by the public. Montalvo received 26.76% and Olvido 11.33%.
 : Karmele and Olvido received 1 vote and for this round the minimum of nominees was 3 so the jury had to save one nominee. They saved Karmele.
 :  There was an immunity challenge in two teams, men team and women team. Montalvo and Noemí are the ones who got a place in the immunity challenge. The jury decided to give immunity to Montalvo.
 :  One of the nominees will be saved on Monday by public vote, and then the public will evict between the other two on Thursday. Noemí (73%) was saved by the public. Karmele received 14% and Sonia 13%.
 : All the contestants were nominated as punishment and only two of them will avoid the nomination through the immunity challenge. Esteban and Jeyko won it and the rest of nominees will face eviction next Tuesday.
 : There wasn't immunity challenge as the final is near. All the contestants were eligible to be nominated.
 :  There was an immunity challenge. The contestants have to cross the punching ball scenario in the least time. The one with the least time wins immunity. Jeyko did the least time, with 11.28 seconds and won immunity.
 : There was a tie in the last nominations between Montalvo and Noemí with 1 vote. The minimum of nominees for this round is 2, so for this reason the defender of the contestants nominated too. The defender nomination is the second one.
 : The three remaining contestants played a challenge where the first one to get the word finalist would become the first finalist. Montalvo became the first finalist.
 : Jeyko and Noemí had to play the last challenge to determinate the next and final finalist where Jeyko got the last place in the final, meanining Noemí ended-up in third place.
 : Montalvo originally won the show with 52% of the votes. However, the production as discovered that he cheated in the challenge. As a result, he was disqualified, finishing in Third place. The finale will be between Jeyko and Noemí, with the winner being decided on 12 September 2013, on the Final Debate.

Nominations total received 

  Nominated
  Immune
  Saved by public or jury

Twists

Jury 
The jury decided the first two eviction. Each jury member voted for the camper that he/she wanted to see evicted. Here the votes.

Nominations darts 
Starting in the second nominations, the campers indicate in the board who they want to nominate, and then they throw the dart. They can nominate campers that they don't want. If a camper fail to nominate 3 times, he/she automatically nominates him/herself.

Controversies 
One day after the program started, on 16 July 2013, various Spanish associations in defense of the scouts, demanded the cancellation of the program. It was because Campamento de Verano was using "scouts" to name the contestants. Then, Telecinco started naming the contestants "explorers".

A new controversy was created when the production team gave to the contestant Noemí Merino a chocolate bath. Unknown to the production team, Noemí is allergic to the chocolate, and the platform Hazte Oír as accused the program to "convert the woman in objets from sex shop denigrate them, show pornography in the television and to turn television into a brothel", and they started a campaign to boycott the program, removing the advertising of the program. Burger King was the first to remove their adverting, followed by Mutua Madrileña and McDonald's. Then also Orange, Amena, Minute Maid and ING Direct also removed their adverting from the show. And finally, El Corte Inglés, Danone, Nestlé and Balay removed their adverting from the show.

One day after the finale of Campamento de Verano, after José Manuel Montalvo being the winner, there are rumours that he cheated in the final challenge, to be a finalist.

Ratings

Live Eviction Shows 
 On Tuesday (July 16 and September 3) and on Thursdays (July 18 to September 5)

Debate Shows 
 On Mondays

References

External links
 Official website

2013 Spanish television seasons
2013 Spanish television series debuts
Spanish reality television series